Getronagan is an Armenian minority high school in the Karaköy district of Istanbul, Turkey, The school is attached to the Saint Gregory the Illuminator Church.

Establishment 

With the sponsorship of Archbishop Nerses Varjabetyan, Getronagan High School opened its doors on September 1, 1886. The Catholicos of All Armenians (the religious leader of all Armenians), Magar, and Harutyun Archbishop Vehabetyan, the Patriarch of Armenians in İstanbul, conducted the opening commencement. Minas Cheraz became its first principal.

Today 
 Getronagan teaches both sexes. In 2001, the school had 182 students. The school teaches mainly in Turkish, but it also has Armenian language and literature and religion classes. English (compulsory), French and Spanish (both optional) are taught as foreign languages.

Notable alumni 
 Hrachia Adjarian - linguist
 Vazken Andréassian - engineer
 Şahan Arzruni - pianist
 Hayko Cepkin - singer
 Onnik Chifte-Saraf - writer
 Arshag Chobanian - writer
 Ara Guler - photographer
 Aram Haigaz - writer
 Karekin II Kazanjian - patriarch
 Mıgırdiç Margosyan - writer, Principal of Surp Haç
 Misak Metsarents - poet
 Sarkis Minassian - journalist
 Kegham Parseghian - writer
 Nigoghos Sarafian - writer, poet
 Levon Shant - writer, poet
 Soghomon Tehlirian - assassin of Talaat Pasha
 Léon Arthur Tutundjian - painter
 Harutyun Varpurciyan - architect
 Nishan Yaubyan - architect
 Yerukhan - writer

Notable teachers and faculty 
 Yeghia Demirjibashian - poet
 Melkon Giurdjian - writer
 Hovhannes Hintliyan - educator (principal)
 Zareh Kalfayan - painter
 Kegham Kavafyan - architect (principal)
 Vahan Tekeyan - writer, poet (principal)
 Tovmas Terzian - writer, playwright

See also

 Armenians in Istanbul
 Education in the Ottoman Empire

References 

High schools in Istanbul
Armenian schools
Educational institutions established in 1886
1886 establishments in the Ottoman Empire
Beyoğlu
Armenian buildings in Turkey